Igor Sergeyevich Strelkov (born 21 March 1982) is a former Russian footballer.

External links
  Player page on the official FC Moscow website
 

1982 births
Russian footballers
FC Lada-Tolyatti players
FC Shakhtar Donetsk players
FC Anzhi Makhachkala players
FC Kuban Krasnodar players
FC Luch Vladivostok players
FC Tom Tomsk players
FC Moscow players
PFC Krylia Sovetov Samara players
Russian Premier League players
Ukrainian Premier League players
Expatriate footballers in Ukraine
Russian expatriate sportspeople in Ukraine
Russian expatriate footballers
Sportspeople from Samara, Russia
Living people
Association football forwards